The lymphatic endothelium is a specialised form of epithelium, distinct from but similar to vascular endothelium. A lymph capillary endothelial cell is distinct from other endothelial cells in that collagen fibers are directly attached to its plasma membrane.

Although lymphatics were first described by Hippocrates in 400BC and rediscovered as "milky veins in the gut of a well fed dog" in the 17th century by Gasparo Aselli, they were ignored for centuries until in 1937 Howard Florey showed that lymphatics enlarge in inflammation. At this stage vascular and lymphatic endothelia were seen to be morphologically distinct and lymphatic vessels considered less important. Later it was discovered that VEGF-R3 and VEGF-C/VEGF-D were the key growth factors controlling lymphatic endothelial proliferation. Markers of lymphatic endolthelium were not discovered until relatively recently. These being LYVE-1 (Jackson et al., 1999) and podoplanin (Kerjaschki, 1999).

See also
Endothelium

References

Further reading

 
 
 
 
 
 
 
 
 
 
 
 
 
 
 

Lymphatic system
Lymphatic tissue